Alton Elementary School may refer to:
Alton Elementary School - Brenham, Texas - Brenham Independent School District
Alton Elementary School - Alton, Texas - Mission Consolidated Independent School District